Lilastvere is a village in Jõgeva Parish, Jõgeva County in eastern Estonia.

As of the 2011 Census, the settlement's population was 30.

References

Villages in Jõgeva County